Derbyshire County Cricket Club in 1914 represents the last cricket season before World War I and was when the English club Derbyshire had been playing for forty three years. It was the club's twentieth season in the County Championship and the team won five matches, ending twelfth in the Championship table.

1914 season

Derbyshire CCC played twenty games in the County Championship in 1914 and no other matches. The captain for the year was Richard Baggallay in his second season as captain. Arthur Morton was top scorer. Tom Forrester took most wickets with 70.

Players who made their debut in 1914 and continued playing for Derbyshire after the war were Walter Reader-Blackton, Geoffrey Bell and James Horsley who had previously played for Nottinghamshire. Joseph Gladwin made his debut in 1914 playing two matches and played one match in 1818. Colin Hurt only played his three first class matches in 1914.

First class cricket and the County Championship were suspended during the Great War and did not resume again until the 1919 season.

Matches

{| class="wikitable" width="100%"
! bgcolor="#efefef" colspan=6 | List of matches
|- bgcolor="#efefef"
!No.
!Date
!V
!Result 
!Margin
!Notes
|- 
|1
| 9 May 1914 
|  Worcestershire County Ground, Derby 
|bgcolor="#00FF00"|Won 
|Innings and 158 runs
|  AG Slater 6–19 and 5–24  
|-
|2
| 16 May 1914 
| Lancashire  Old Trafford, Manchester 
|bgcolor="#FF0000"|Lost 
|35 runs
|  Sharp 105; T Forrester 5–47 and 5–83 
|-
|3
|23 May 1914 
| Nottinghamshire  Queen's Park, Chesterfield 
|bgcolor="#00FF00"|Won 
|5 runs
|  Wass 6–86 and 7–91 
|-
|4
|27 May 1914 
| Hampshire May's Bounty, Basingstoke 
|bgcolor="#FF0000"|Lost 
|8 wickets
|  AG Slater 99; Greig 100; Jacques 8–67 and 6–38; SWA Cadman 6–94  
|-
|5
|1 Jun 1914 
| Essex   County Ground, Leyton 
|bgcolor="#FF0000"|Lost 
|145 runs
|  T Forrester 7–89 and 7–124; Johnny Douglas 6–77 and 6–73   
|-
|6
|8 Jun 1914 
| Yorkshire Headingley, Leeds 
|bgcolor="#FF0000"|Lost 
|Innings and 5 runs
|  Wilson 101; SWA Cadman 5–69; W Rhodes 7–19  
|-
|7
|11 Jun 1914 
| Warwickshire Edgbaston, Birmingham 
|bgcolor="#FF0000"|Lost 
|125 runs
|  F Foster 6–18; A Morton 5–26; Howell 6–31  
|-
|8
|20 Jun 1914 
| Northamptonshire  County Ground, Derby 
|bgcolor="#FFCC00"|Drawn
|
|  L Oliver 124; Denton 102; Haywood 100   
|-
|9
|27 Jun 1914 
| Somerset Queen's Park, Chesterfield 
|bgcolor="#00FF00"|Won 
|167 runs
|  White 5–61; J Horsley 5–32  
|-
|10
|4 Jul 1914 
| Nottinghamshire  Trent Bridge, Nottingham 
|bgcolor="#FF0000"|Lost 
|152 runs
|  Payton 104; Barratt 5–54 and 5–68  
|-
|11
|11 Jul 1914 
| Lancashire  County Ground, Derby 
|bgcolor="#FFCC00"|Drawn
|
|  Bullough 5–123  
|-
|12
|16 Jul 1914 
| Yorkshire Queen's Park, Chesterfield 
|bgcolor="#FF0000"|Lost 
|Innings and 48 runs
|  J Horsley 6–77; Drake 5–6  
|-
|13
|24 Jul 1914 
| Northamptonshire  County Ground, Northampton 
|bgcolor="#FF0000"|Lost 
|Innings and 3 runs
|  Thompson 6–52 and 5–80; J Horsley 5–77  
|-
|14
|30 Jul 1914 
| SomersetCounty Ground, Taunton 
|bgcolor="#FF0000"|Lost 
|6 wickets
|  Robson 7–32 and 7–64; SWA Cadman 6–27  
|-
|15
|3 Aug 1914 
| Essex   County Ground, Derby 
|bgcolor="#FF0000"|Lost 
|Innings and 131 runs
|  A Morton 6–95; Johnny Douglas 6–21; Tremlin 6–43  
|-
|16
|6 Aug 1914 
| Leicestershire Aylestone Road, Leicester 
|bgcolor="#FFCC00"|Drawn
|
|  Brown 7–51 and 5–78  
|-
|17
|10 Aug 1914 
| Warwickshire  County Ground, Derby 
|bgcolor="#FF0000"|Lost 
|6 wickets
|  Foster 5–47; Santall 5–66; AG Slater 6–51   
|-
|18
|13 Aug 1914 
| Hampshire Queen's Park, Chesterfield 
|bgcolor="#FF0000"|Lost 
|15 runs
|  A Morton 5–31; Kennedy 5–71; AG Slater 5–89; Newman 7–64  
|-
|19
|17 Aug 1914 
| Leicestershire The Town Ground, Burton-on-Trent 
|bgcolor="#00FF00"|Won 
|6 wickets
|  Wood 147; J Horsley 6–17  
|-
|20
|29 Aug 1914 
|  WorcestershireCounty Ground, New Road, Worcester 
|bgcolor="#00FF00"|Won 
|5 wickets
|  M Foster 158; SWA Cadman 119; J Horsley 5–40  
|-
|

Statistics

County Championship batting averages

County Championship bowling averages

Wicket Keeping
Joe Humphries – Catches 21, Stumping 7

See also
Derbyshire County Cricket Club seasons
1914 English cricket season

References

1914 in English cricket
Derbyshire County Cricket Club seasons
English cricket seasons in the 20th century